Jovanotti for President is the first studio album by Italian singer-songwriter Jovanotti, released by FRI Records in 1988.

The album reached number three on the FIMI Singles Chart.

Track listing

Charts and certifications

Charts

Year-end charts

Certifications

References

1988 debut albums
Jovanotti albums
Italian-language albums